Cleopatra, Hereditary Princess of Oettingen-Oettingen and Oettingen-Spielberg (née Baroness Cleopatra von Adelsheim von Ernest; born on 3 October 1987), known professionally as Cleo von Adelsheim, is a Swiss-born German-Chilean actress and model. She is known for her title role in the 2015 German television film Prinzessin Maleen. In 2016 she married Franz Albrecht, Hereditary Prince of Oettingen-Oettingen and Oettingen-Spielberg, the heir to the German princely house of Oettingen-Spielberg.

Early life and education 
Baroness Cleopatra von Adelsheim von Ernest was born in 1987 in Bern, Switzerland. Her father is Baron Louis von Adelsheim von Ernest, a filmmaker and son of Baron Joachim Karl von Adelsheim von Ernest and Helga Annemarie Irmingard von Zitzewitz. Her mother is Lillian Elena Baettig Rodríguez, daughter of José Vicente Baettig Dättwyler and Teresa Elvira Rodríguez Nieto. Von Adelsheim's mother is Chilean, and the family relocated there from Switzerland when she was a child. She attended an English-language school in Santiago de Chile. She later attended Schule Schloss Salem, a boarding school in Germany, before transferring to Hurtwood House, a boarding school in England. She studied international communications and journalism at the American University of Paris. In 2013 she graduated from the Centro de Cinematografia de Catalunya in Barcelona, Spain.

Career 
Von Adelsheim began her acting career after graduating from the Centro de Cinematografia de Catalunya in Spain. She acted in short films, including Parker Ellermann's short film Seduction, before landing a role as the title character in the television movie Prinzessin Maleen, which aired on the German channel for Northern Italy. After the television film, she appeared in two television series, Cologne P.D. and Der Kriminalist. 

Von Adelsheim is signed with Louisa Models, The People Agency, and V.Communication as a model, brand ambassador, and fashion influencer. She has posed for German fashion photographer Christian Schoppe. In August 2020 Von Adelsheim modelled in an advertisement campaign for the fashion line Fleur du Soleil, a collaboration between Sandra Mansour and H&M. In November 2020 she was featured in German Vogue. 

As the Hereditary Princess of Oettingen-Oettingen and Oettingen-Spielberg, Von Adelsheim works with the museum at Schloss Oettingen, one of the family residences. In June 2020 she presented awards to the winners of a photography competition at the castle. She is an active member of the Oettingen-Spielberg Family Foundation, which supports underprivileged people in Bavaria.

Personal life 
On 4 June 2016 von Adelsheim married Franz Albrecht, Hereditary Prince of Oettingen-Oettingen and Oettingen-Spielberg in a civil ceremony performed by Klaus Gramlich, the mayor of Adelsheim. On 9 July 2016 they were married in a religious ceremony at St. Jakob Church in Oettingen in Bayern. Princess Isabella Gaetani von Lobkowicz and Beatrice Borromeo served as maids of honour. The reception was held at Oettingen Castle. The wedding had eight hundred guests, including Prince Harry, Duke of Sussex, Prince Max, Duke in Bavaria, and Pierre Casiraghi.

She and her husband live in Madrid, around the club Puerta de Hierro, where they are neighbours of Prince Christian of Hanover and his wife Alessandra de Osma. They also own a finca in Guadalajara. On 8 September 2017 the princess gave birth to a daughter, Princess Matilda Galilea. On 10 August 2019 she gave birth to a son, Prince Louis-Albrecht. In February 2023 Princess Cleo announces that she and her husband are expecting their third child.

Filmography 
 2012: La Numero 4 (short film)
 2012: Collage (short film)
 2012: Entre Lineas (short film)
 2012: Extraño Perfecto (short film)
 2013: Seduction (short film)
 2015: Prinzessin Maleen (TV movie)
 2015: Cologne P.D. (Episode: Naked Facts)
 2017: Der Kriminalist (episode: Shadow Girl)

References

External links 
 

Living people
1987 births
21st-century Chilean actresses
21st-century German actresses
American University of Paris alumni
Chilean people of German descent
Chilean television actresses
Chilean film actresses
Chilean female models
Fashion influencers
German female models
German television actresses
German film actresses
German people of Chilean descent
German baronesses
German princesses
Princesses by marriage
House of Oettingen-Spielberg
People from Bern
People educated at Hurtwood House
Alumni of Schule Schloss Salem